The 2012 Oregon State Beavers baseball team represented Oregon State University in the 2012 NCAA Division I baseball season. The team participated in the Pac-12 Conference.  They were coached by Pat Casey and assistant coaches Marty Lees, Pat Bailey, and Nate Yeskie.  They played home games in Goss Stadium at Coleman Field. The Beavers finished the season with a 40–20 overall record, and came in fourth (tied with Arizona State and Stanford, just two wins behind first) in the Pac-12 Conference Championship with 18 wins and 12 losses.

The team was selected as the #2 seed to participate in the Baton Rouge Regional in the 2012 NCAA Division I baseball tournament, where they lost to #1 seed and #7 national seed Louisiana State 5–6 in the finals during extra innings.

Previous season
Oregon State finished the 2011 regular season with a 41–17 overall record, and came in third in the Pac-12 Conference Championship with 17 wins and 10 losses.  The team was selected to host a Regional in the 2011 NCAA Division I baseball tournament, and as such were seeded #1 in the Corvallis Regional. The Beavers won all three of their games in the Corvallis Regional and went on to play the Vanderbilt Commodores in the Nashville Super Regional, where they lost 1–11.

Highlights
On May 25, 2012 Pat Casey became the Oregon State University program's all-time winningest coach after winning against rival Oregon 7–3.
Having participated in the Baton Rouge Regional they have now participated in the NCAA tournament a school record 4 consecutive years.
This was their second consecutive and fifth all-time season with at least 40 wins.
Michael Conforto, a freshman, set a new single-season RBI record of 76.

Roster

Rankings

See also
Oregon State Beavers baseball
2012 NCAA Division I baseball season

References

External links
Oregon State Beavers baseball team
Pac-12 baseball

Oregon State Beavers baseball seasons
Oregon State Beavers Baseball Team, 2012
2012 in sports in Oregon